Sternberger Seenlandschaft is an Amt in the Ludwigslust-Parchim district, in Mecklenburg-Vorpommern, Germany. The seat of the Amt is in Sternberg. Other major places are Brüel and Dabel.

The Amt Sternberger Seenlandschaft consists of the following municipalities:

Ämter in Mecklenburg-Western Pomerania